The following is a list of notable deaths in November 2013.

Entries for each day are listed alphabetically by surname. A typical entry lists information in the following sequence:
Name, age, country of citizenship and reason for notability, established cause of death, reference.

November 2013

1
François Bovon, 75, Swiss biblical scholar and historian.
Albert Chaumarat, 86, French cyclist.
João Crevelim, 69, Brazilian footballer and manager, generalized infection.
Harlan's Holiday, 14, American Thoroughbred racehorse, euthanized.
Tato Laviera, 63, American Nuyorican poet, diabetes.
Hermann Levinson, 89, German biologist and physiologist.
Lawrence Marcus, 96, American-Jewish businessperson.
John Mazur, 83, American football player and coach.
John Y. McCollister, 92, American politician, member of the House of Representatives from Nebraska (1971–1977), cancer.
Hakimullah Mehsud, 34, Pakistani Taliban leader, drone strike.
Mario Ojeda Gómez, 86, Mexican scholar and diplomat.
Paul Dennis Reid, 55, American convicted murderer, complications from pneumonia and heart failure.
Eugène Rhéaume, 80, Canadian politician, MP for the Northwest Territories (1963–1965).
Piet Rietveld, 61, Dutch economist.
Editta Sherman, 101, American photographer, longtime resident of Carnegie Hall.

2
Jack Alexander, 77, Scottish entertainer and comedian, stroke.
Bill Beall, 91, American football coach (LSU Tigers).
Walt Bellamy, 74, American Hall of Fame basketball player, Olympic gold medalist (1960).
Vasco Giuseppe Bertelli, 89, Italian Roman Catholic prelate, Bishop of Volterra (1985–2000).
Brita Borge, 82, Norwegian politician. 
Robert R. Bowie, 104, American diplomat and academic.
Eugene Callender, 87, American pastor and activist.
Zlatko Crnković, 82, Croatian literary translator.
Ghislaine Dupont, 57, French journalist, shot.
Joop Eversteijn, 92, Dutch footballer (ADO Den Haag).
Josef Ezr, 90, Czech Olympic basketballer.
Målfrid Grude Flekkøy, 78, Norwegian psychologist and children's ombudsman. 
Hugh Gurling, 63, English geneticist, heart attack.
Montgomery Kaluhiokalani, 54, American surfer, lung cancer.
Beatrice Kemmerer, 83, American AAGPBL baseball player.
Mitsuo Komatsubara, 95, Japanese professional golfer, heart failure.
Bill Lawrence, 82, German-born American electric guitar designer and maker.
Clifford Nass, 55, American academic and author (The Media Equation), heart attack.
Kjell Qvale, 94, Norwegian-born American businessman (Jensen Motors).
Milanko Renovica, 85, Yugoslav politician, President of the Executive Council of SR Bosnia and Herzegovina (1974–1982); President of the Presidency (1984–1985).
Russ Sullivan, 90, American baseball player (Detroit Tigers).
Alfred Umgeher, 87, Austrian sprint canoer.

3
D. Rajendra Babu, 62, Indian film director and screenwriter, heart attack.
Lambert Bartak, 94, American stadium organist.
Rifkat Bogdanov, 63, Russian mathematician.
Nick Cardy, 93, American comic book artist (Aquaman, Teen Titans, Superman), heart failure.
Gerard Cieślik, 86, Polish footballer (Ruch Chorzów).
Gamani Corea, 87, Sri Lankan diplomat and civil servant, Secretary-General of the United Nations Conference on Trade and Development (1974–1984).
William J. Coyne, 77, American politician, member of the House of Representatives from Pennsylvania (1981–2003).
Philip Fang, 72, Hong Kong simultaneous interpreter, chief of the United Nations Chinese interpretation section, suicide by jumping.
Geza Gallos, 65, Austrian footballer (SK Rapid Wien).
Rupert Gerritsen, 60, Australian historian.
Ryszard Kraus, 49, Polish footballer (Górnik Zabrze, GKS Tychy).
Andro Linklater, 68, Scottish writer and historian, heart attack.
Leonard Long, 102, Australian landscape painter.
Brian Manning, 81, Australian trade unionist and political activist.
Austin John Marshall, 76, English record producer and artist.
Vladimir Musalimov, 69, Ukrainian Soviet Olympic boxer (1968).
William Pollack, 87, British-born American immunologist, developed the Rho(D) immune globulin vaccine for Rh disease, complications from diabetes and heart disease. 
Reshma, c. 66, Pakistani folk singer, throat cancer.
Bernard Roberts, 80, English pianist.
Joyce Rose, 84, British magistrate and politician.
Trần Văn Quang, 96, Vietnamese army colonel general.
Agim Zajmi, 76, Albanian painter.

4
Hakon Barfod, 87, Norwegian Olympic sailor (1948, 1952).
Roger Barton, 67, English footballer.
Suzanne M. Bianchi, 61, American sociologist, pancreatic cancer.
Hans von Borsody, 84, Austrian-born German actor.
Viktor Dolnik, 75, Russian ornithologist.
Lois Graham, 88, American professor of thermodynamics and cryogenics.
John D. Hawk, 89, American World War II veteran, Medal of Honor recipient.
Betty Hill, 76, Canadian politician, diabetes.
Reinaldo Leandro Mora, 93, Venezuelan educator and politician.
Jane Cleo Marshall Lucas, 92–93, first African American female to pass the Maryland bar exam.
Leon Miękina, 83, Polish writer.
Eleanor Mlotek, 91, American musicologist.
Elfed Morris, 71, Welsh footballer (Chester City). 
Mohan Rai, 80, Indian cricketer.
John Steele, 86, British oceanographer.
Leonid Stolovich, 84, Russian-born Estonian philosopher.
Georg Wahl, 93, German dressage instructor, rider and trainer.
Ray Willsey, 85, Canadian-born American football player and coach.

5
Habibollah Asgaroladi, 81, Iranian politician and presidential candidate, Leader of Islamic Coalition Party (1998–2008), lung problems.
Juan Carlos Calabró, 79, Argentine actor (Johny Tolengo, el majestuoso), kidney disease.
Dino Gifford, 96, Italian footballer.
Ian Irvine, 84, New Zealand rugby union player (North Auckland, national team).
Tony Iveson, 94, British Royal Air Force pilot and World War II veteran.
Lounis Matem, 72, Algerian footballer (ES Sétif, CR Belouizdad).
Charles Mosley, 65, British genealogist, cancer.
Abdou Nef, 18, Algerian footballer, traffic collision.
Carl Ogden, 84, American insurance company executive and politician.
Daniel Orts, 89, French cyclist.
Ed Pincus, 75, American documentary filmmaker.
Georges Ramoulux, 93, French cyclist.
William B. Spofford, 92, American bishop.
Juan Manuel Tenuta, 89, Uruguayan actor, stroke.
Bobby Thomason, 85, American football player (Philadelphia Eagles), heart failure.
Charlie Trotter, 54, American chef and restaurateur, stroke.
Stuart Williams, 83, Welsh international footballer.

6
Þórdís Árnadóttir, 80, Icelandic Olympic swimmer.
Guillermina Bravo, 92, Mexican ballet dancer and choreographer.
Tarla Dalal, 77, Indian food writer and chef, cardiac arrest.
Jorge Dória, 92, Brazilian actor and humorist, cardiorespiratory failure. 
Elton Engstrom Jr., 78, American politician, member of the Alaska House of Representatives (1965–1967) and Senate (1967–1971).
Peter Fatialofa, 54, Samoan rugby union player and coach, heart attack.
Yosef Harish, 90, Israeli jurist, Attorney General (1986–1993).
Arvid Johanson, 84, Norwegian politician and newspaper editor, Minister of Petroleum and Energy (1980–1981).
Christian López, 29, Guatemalan Olympic weightlifter (2008, 2012), ARDS. 
Dan Lurie, 90, American bodybuilder and fitness pioneer.
Ian Roy MacLennan, 94, Canadian fighter pilot and flying ace.
Vikram Marwah, 88, Indian orthopedic surgeon.
Ace Parker, 101, American football (Brooklyn Dodgers) and baseball player Philadelphia Athletics, member of the Pro Football Hall of Fame.
Cheb i Sabbah, 66, Algerian musician and composer, stomach cancer.
Clyde Stacy, 77, American musician, co-creator of the Tulsa Sound, traffic collision.
Sammy Taylor, 80, Scottish footballer.
Roberto Zárate, 80, Argentine footballer

7
John Cole, 85, British broadcaster and journalist, BBC political editor (1981–1992).
Adolfo Constenla Umaña, 65, Costa Rican philologist and linguist, cancer.
Ian Davies, 57, Australian Olympic basketball player (1980, 1984), Australian Basketball Hall of Fame inductee (2001).
 Ron Dellow, 99, English football player and manager.
C. R. De Silva, 65, Sri Lankan lawyer, Attorney General (2007–2008), Solicitor General (2000–2007).
Mary Eyre, 89, British hockey and tennis player.
Nikolai Karpov, 83, Russian Olympic ice hockey player (1960). 
Joey Manley, 48, American website publisher (Modern Tales), pneumonia.
Paul Mantee, 82, American actor (Apollo 13, Cagney & Lacey, Robinson Crusoe on Mars).
Jack Mitchell, 88, American photographer and author.
 Nam Tae Hi, 84, South Korean martial artist, pioneering master of taekwondo.
Joseph Rhodes Jr., 66, American politician and activist, member of the Pennsylvania House of Representatives (1973–1980).
Amparo Rivelles, 88, Spanish actress.
 Manfred Rommel, 84, German politician, Lord Mayor of Stuttgart (1974–1996).
Charlotte Streifer Rubinstein, 91, American teacher of art and art history.
Lenny Rzeszewski, 90, American college basketball player.
 Colin Watts, 92, Australian cricketer.
Sanford Yung, 86, Hong Kong accountant, politician and racehorse owner.

8
Chitti Babu, 49, Indian comedian and actor, brain tumour.
John Bell Jr., 76, American artist, stomach cancer.
Michael Glyn Brown, 56, American hand surgeon, cardiac arrest.
William C. Davidon, 86, American scientist and peace activist.
Marianne Edwards, 82, American child actress.
Kris Ife, 67, English pop singer, heart attack.
Penn Kimball, 98, American journalist and college professor (Columbia University).
Carl Lovsted, 83, American Olympic rower (1952).
Maxie McFarland, American soldier.
Rod Miller, 73, American baseball player (Brooklyn Dodgers).
Esko Niemi, 79, Finnish ice hockey player.
Lică Nunweiller, 74, Romanian footballer (Dinamo).
Arnold Rosner, 68, American classical music composer.
Harry Sawyerr, 87, Ghanaian politician and quantity surveyor.
Chiyoko Shimakura, 75, Japanese singer and actress, liver cancer.
Amanchi Venkata Subrahmanyam, 56, Indian actor, liver failure.
Sir John Whitehead, 81, British diplomat, Ambassador to Japan (1986–1992).

9
Savaş Ay, 59, Turkish journalist, throat cancer.
John Dendahl, 75, American politician and Olympic skier (1960).
Helen Eadie, 66, Scottish politician, MSP for Dunfermline East (1999–2011); Cowdenbeath (since 2011), cancer.
Grethe Rytter Hasle, 93, Norwegian biologist.
Peter Krummeck, 66, South African actor and playwright, cancer.
Kalaparusha Maurice McIntyre, 77, American jazz saxophonist.
Steve Prescott, 39, English rugby league player, stomach cancer.
Vasile Suciu, 71, Romanian footballer, lung cancer.
Emile Zuckerkandl, 91, Austrian-born American biologist.

10
Kirpal Singh Bhardwaj, 78, Kenyan Olympic hockey player.
Dragomir Čumić, 76, Serbian actor. 
Vijaydan Detha, 87, Indian folk writer, cardiac arrest.
John Grant, 91, Australian neurosurgeon and disability sport administrator.
Richard Grathoff, 79, German phenomenologist.
Carl Hilliard, 76, American journalist, reporter and columnist (The Associated Press), heart attack.
Richie Jean Jackson, 81, American author, teacher, and civil rights activist.
Jiang Zejia, 92–93, Chinese electrical engineer and educator.
John Matchefts, 82, American Olympic ice hockey player.
Sir Humphrey Maud, 79, British diplomat.
Michael A. Miles, 74, American business executive (Kraft Foods, Philip Morris).
Giorgio Orelli, 92, Swiss poet.
Tommy Quick, 58, Swedish Olympic archer.
Safdar Rahmat Abadi, Iranian government official, deputy industry minister, shot.
James Harlan Steele, 100, American veterinarian.
Pushpa Thangadorai, 82, Indian Tamil language author.

11
Dayananda Bajracharya, 69, Nepalese academic.
John Barnhill, 75, American basketball player and coach.
Domenico Bartolucci, 96, Italian Roman Catholic cardinal, Deacon of the Gesù e Maria church in Rome.
Anne Barton, 80, British Shakespearean scholar.
Bob Beckham, 86, American music publisher and country singer.
John S. Dunne, 83, American priest and theologian, complications from a head injury.
William Fyfe, 86, New Zealand geologist. 
Stein Grieg Halvorsen, 104, Norwegian theater actor, natural causes.
Atilla Karaosmanoğlu, 81, Turkish economist and politician, Deputy Prime Minister (1971), respiratory failure.
Henry Curtis Lind, 92, American lawyer.
Diego Llopis, 84, Spanish footballer.
Eddie McGrady, 78, Northern Irish politician, MP for South Down (1987–2010).
Shirley Mitchell, 94, American actress (The Red Skelton Show, Perry Mason, I Love Lucy), heart failure.
Jerome Murphy-O'Connor, 78, Irish biblical scholar.
George Reinholt, 73, American actor (Another World, One Life to Live).
István Telegdy, 85, Hungarian Olympic sailor (1960).
Morton Yolkut, 70, American rabbi.

12
Mavis Batey, 92, British World War II codebreaker.
Allan Blank, 87, American composer, brain tumor.
Hetty Bower, 108, British political activist.
Raymond S. Burton, 74, American politician, Executive Councillor for New Hampshire District 1 (1977–1979, since 1981), kidney cancer.
Giuseppe Casari, 91, Italian Olympic footballer (Atalanta Bergamo, Napoli).
Geo Costiniu, 63, Romanian actor, adenocarcinoma.
Zoltan Czaka, 80, Romanian Olympic ice hockey player.
Erik Dyreborg, 73, Danish footballer.
Katherine Hagedorn, 52, American musicologist.
Luis Ibarra, 76, Chilean footballer and manager.
Festus Iyayi, 66, Nigerian writer and academic, traffic collision.
Mavis Kelsey, 101, American physician.
John McCormick, 76, American football player (Minnesota Vikings, Denver Broncos).
Sehadete Mekuli, 85, Kosovar gynecologist and academic.
Steve Rexe, 66, Canadian Olympic bronze medallist ice hockey player (1968).
Manuel Ray Rivero, 88–89, Cuban engineer and political activist.
Konrad Rudnicki, 87, Polish astronomer.
Al Ruscio, 89, American actor (The Godfather Part III, Showgirls).
Aleksandr Serebrov, 69, Soviet cosmonaut.
Dumitru Sigmirean, 54, Romanian footballer, lung cancer.
Péter Szőr, 43, Hungarian information security specialist.
Sir John Tavener, 69, British composer (Children of Men), complications from Marfan syndrome.
Kurt Trampedach, 70, Danish painter and sculptor, cardiac arrest.
Antigoni Valakou, 83, Greek theatre actress.
William Weaver, 90, American translator of modern Italian literature.

13
 Chieko Aioi, 78, Japanese actress and voice actress, heart failure.
 Onesimo Cadiz Gordoncillo, 78, Filipino Roman Catholic prelate, Bishop of Tagbilaran (1976–1986) and Archbishop of Capiz (1986–2011).
 José Cantón, 76, Spanish footballer.
 Todd Christensen, 57, American football player (Los Angeles Raiders), complications during liver transplant surgery.
Thierry Gerbier, 48, French Olympic biathlete.
Eugène Hanck, 85, Luxembourgian Olympic sprint canoer (1952).
Hans-Jürgen Heise, 83, German author and poet. 
 Barbara Lawrence, 83, American actress (Oklahoma!) and businesswoman.
 Claudette Masdammer, 74, Guyanese Olympic sprinter.
 Nikolaos Martis, 98, Greek politician and minister.
 Mauro Nesti, 78, Italian racecar driver, eight-time European Hill Climb champion.
Roland Paoletti, 82, British architect.
Pierre Scribante, 82, French cyclist.
Daniel J. Shanefield, 83, American ceramic engineer.
 Robert Vito, American television correspondent and bureau chief (CNN), pancreatic cancer.

14
 Georgina Anderson, 15, English singer, liver cancer.
 Augustine, 58, Indian actor, renal failure.
Sudhir Bhat, 61–62, Indian theatre producer, heart attack.
Mike Cappelletti, 71, American bridge and poker player, and author.
 Piet de Wolf, 91, Dutch football manager.
 Hari Krishna Devsare, 75, Indian author of children's literature and magazine editor (Parag).
 Dena Epstein, 96, American music librarian and author.
 Barbara Handman, 85, American political consultant and Broadway theatre preservationist, complications from Alzheimer's disease.
Ramziya al-Iryani, 58–59, Yemeni novelist, writer, diplomat and feminist.
 Bennett Masinga, 48, South African footballer.
 Jim McCluskey, 63, Scottish football referee.
Olivia Robertson, 96, British religious leader, high priestess of the Fellowship of Isis.
Reg Sinclair, 88, Canadian ice hockey player (New York Rangers, Detroit Red Wings).

15
Sheila Matthews Allen, 84, American actress (The Towering Inferno, The Poseidon Adventure), pulmonary fibrosis.
Karla Álvarez, 41, Mexican actress (Qué Bonito Amor), respiratory failure.
Kurt Caselli, 30, American motocross rider, race collision.
Glafcos Clerides, 94, Cypriot politician, President (1974, 1993–2003).
Keith Cumberpatch, 86, New Zealand field hockey player.
Raimondo D'Inzeo, 88, Italian Olympic show jumping rider.
Félix Geybels, 77, Belgian international footballer (Beringen, national team).
T. J. Jemison, 95, American Christian leader, president of the National Baptist Convention, USA, Inc. (1982–1994).
Mickey Knox, 91, American actor and screenwriter (The Good, the Bad and the Ugly, G.I. Blues).
Heinz Lorenz, 97, Czechoslovak Olympic athlete.
Kripalu Maharaj, 91, Indian Hindu spiritual leader.
Mike McCormack, 83, American Hall of Fame football player (Cleveland Browns) and coach.
Barbara Park, 66, American author of children's books (Junie B. Jones), ovarian cancer.
Andrew Semple, 101, British medical officer.

16
Chris Argyris, 90, American business theorist. 
Robert Conley, 85, American journalist and radio host (All Things Considered), parotid cancer.
Billy Hardwick, 72, American ten-pin bowler, heart attack.
Zbyněk Hejda, 83, Czech poet and historian, recipient of the Jaroslav Seifert Prize (1996).
Harold Hofmann, 81, American politician, Mayor of Lawndale, California (since 1990), natural causes.
William McDonough Kelly, 88, Canadian politician, Senator (1982–2000).
Tanvir Ahmad Khan, 81, Pakistani public servant and diplomat, Foreign Secretary (1989–1990).
Hilary Laing, 86, British Olympic skier.
Oscar Lanford, 73, American mathematician. 
Erik Loe, 93, Norwegian journalist and editor.
Ian MacPherson, 73–74, Canadian historian.
Johnny Martin, 66, English footballer (Colchester United, Workington, Southport).
Arne Pedersen, 82, Norwegian footballer (Fredrikstad, national team).
Robin Plunket, 8th Baron Plunket, 87, British peer.
Louis D. Rubin Jr., 89, American writer and publisher.
William Ward, 4th Earl of Dudley, 93, British peer. 
Charles Waterhouse, 89, American artist.
Jock Young, 71, British criminologist, anaplastic thyroid cancer.

17
Zeke Bella, 83, American baseball player (New York Yankees, Kansas City Athletics), complications from stroke and fall.
Sir Alfred Blake, 98, British Royal Marines officer and solicitor, Director of the Duke of Edinburgh's Award Scheme (1967–1978).
Frank Chamberlin, 35, American football player (Tennessee Titans), brain cancer.
Joe Dean, 83, American Collegiate Hall of Fame basketball player (2012), LSU athletic director (1987–2000).
Syd Field, 77, American screenwriting guru, hemolytic anemia.
Herbert Gordon, 61, Jamaican footballer, complications from diabetes.
Doris Lessing, 94, British novelist (The Grass Is Singing, The Golden Notebook, The Good Terrorist), poet, playwright and librettist, laureate of Nobel Prize in Literature (2007).
Antonio J. Marino, 92, American politician, Mayor of Lynn, Massachusetts (1972–1973, 1976–1985).
Nicholas Mevoli, 32, American deep water diver, pulmonary edema.
Gerald Spring Rice, 6th Baron Monteagle of Brandon, 87, British peer and businessman.
George Thuo, 46, Kenyan politician, member of the National Assembly for Juja Constituency (2007–2010).
Om Prakash Valmiki, 63, Indian writer, liver cancer.
Mary Nesbitt Wisham, 88, American baseball player.

18
Bob Bentley, 84, Canadian politician, consequences of a vehicle accident.
Peter Cartwright, 78, South African-born British actor.
Forrest Claunch, 73, American politician, pancreatic cancer.
Thomas Howard, 30, American football player (Oakland Raiders), traffic collision.
Sir Jock Kennedy, 85, British air marshal.
Daryl Logullo, 47, American e-commerce executive.
Helen Norris, 97, American novelist and short story author.
Bennett Reimer, 81, American music professor. 
Nejat Uygur, 86, Turkish comedian.
S. R. D. Vaidyanathan, 84, Indian musician.
Ljubomir Vračarević, 66, Serbian martial artist, founder of Real Aikido.
Peter Wintonick, 60, Canadian documentary filmmaker, cholangiocarcinoma.

19
Babe Birrer, 85, American baseball player (Detroit Tigers, Baltimore Orioles, Los Angeles Dodgers).
Marc Breaux, 89, American choreographer (The Sound of Music, Mary Poppins).
Nan Campbell, 87, American politician, first female Mayor of Bellevue, Washington (1988–1989), pneumonia.
Taisia Chenchik, 77, Ukrainian Soviet Olympic bronze medalist (1964) and European champion athlete (1966).
Gunter Christmann, 77, German-born Australian painter.
Dora Dougherty Strother, 91, American test pilot and engineer.
André Filippini, 89, Swiss businessman and Olympic bronze medalist bobsledder (1952).
Ray Gosling, 74, British broadcaster and gay rights activist.
John Ingamells, 79, British art historian.
Bob Kiley, 80, American ice-hockey player.
Joseph Frans Lescrauwaet, 90, Dutch Roman Catholic prelate, Auxiliary Bishop of Haarlem (1983–1995).
Diane Disney Miller, 79, American philanthropist, complications from a fall.
Matthias N'Gartéri Mayadi, 71, Chadian Roman Catholic prelate, Archbishop of N'Djaména (since 2003).
Jacquelyn K. O'Brien, 82, American politician.
Frederick Sanger, 95, British biochemist, laureate of Nobel Prize in Chemistry (1958, 1980).
Antoni Tomiczek, 98, Polish World War II pilot.
Charlotte Zolotow, 98, American author and poet.

20
Bruce Bilby, 91, British mechanical engineer.
Pavel Bobek, 76, Czech singer.
Sylvia Browne, 77, American author and self-proclaimed psychic.
Yevgeny Cherkasov, 83, Russian Olympic sport shooter.
Joseph Paul Franklin, 63, American serial killer, executed by lethal injection.
Peter Griffiths, 85, British politician, MP for Smethwick (1964–1966) and Portsmouth North (1979–1997).
Gardner Hathaway, 88, American CIA officer.
José Hernández, 69, Spanish painter and engraver.
Dieter Hildebrandt, 86, German kabarettist, cancer.
Austin Ikin, 83, South African Olympic rower.
Rafiqul Islam, 63, Bangladeshi-born Canadian language activist, leukaemia.
Frank Lauterbur, 88, American football head coach (University of Toledo, University of Iowa), dementia and Parkinson's disease.
Beth MacKenzie, 53, Canadian nurse and politician.
Oleg Minko, 75, Ukrainian painter.
Sokol Olldashi, 40, Albanian politician, MP (since 2001), Minister of Public Works, Transportation and Telecommunications, traffic collision.
Klaus Praefcke, 80, German chemist.
Franco Selleri, 77, Italian theoretical physicist.
Justus Smith, 91, American rower, Olympic champion (1948).
Raymond P. Spillenger, 89, American painter.
Sir Cyril Townsend, 75, British politician, MP for Bexleyheath (1974–1997).
Émile Véron, 88, French entrepreneur (Majorette), co-creator of Norev model cars.
Juan José Wedel, 69, Costa Rican Olympic archer.
Hellmuth Wolff, 76, Swiss-born Canadian organ builder.

21
Jindřich Balcar, 63, Czech Olympic ski jumper (1976).
Ronny Coaches, Ghanaian musician (Buk Bak), heart attack.
James Cumes, 91, Australian author and economist.
John Egerton, 78, American journalist and author, heart attack.
Peter Frank, 79, British political scientist.
Theo Gerdener, 97, South African politician, Interior Minister (1970–1972), leader of the Democratic Party (1973–1977).
Ahmad Jan, Afghan politician. 
Fred Kavli, 86, Norwegian businessman, founded Kavlico Corporation.
Dimitri Mihalas, 74, American astrophysicist. 
Vern Mikkelsen, 85, American Hall of Fame basketball player (Minneapolis Lakers).
Herbert Mitgang, 93, American author, editor, journalist, playwright and producer.
Mike Palagyi, 96, American baseball player (Washington Senators).
Bernard Parmegiani, 86, French composer. 
Cyril Perkins, 102, English cricketer.
Vadde Ramesh, 66, Indian film producer, cancer.
Elfriede Spiegelhauer-Uhlig, 79, German Olympic cross-country skier.
Tony Summers, 89, British Olympic swimmer (1948).
Conrad Susa, 78, American opera composer (Transformations).
Tôn Thất Đính, 87, Vietnamese army lieutenant general. 
Maurice Vachon, 84, Canadian professional wrestler.
Michael Weiner, 51, American labor leader and lawyer, executive director of the MLBPA, brain tumor.
George Werley, 75, American baseball player (Baltimore Orioles).

22
Wanda Coleman, 67, American poet and screenwriter.
Mircea Crișan, 89, Romanian comedian and comedic actor.
Don Dailey, 57, American computer programmer, leukemia.
Brian Dawson, 74, British folk singer and song collector.
Abelardo Estorino, 88, Cuban dramatist, director, and theater critic.
Tom Gilmartin, 78, Irish businessman, Mahon Tribunal witness.
Pierre Jacques Joatton, 83, French Roman Catholic prelate, Bishop of Saint-Étienne (1988−2006).
Aleksandr Komarov, 90, Russian world champion ice hockey player (1954).
Georges Lautner, 87, French film director and screenwriter.
Paul Mayer, 82, German–born American Catholic priest and peace activist.
*Jancarlos de Oliveira Barros, 30, Brazilian footballer, traffic collision.
Alec Reid, 82, Irish priest and peacemaker.
Robert B. Rutherford, 81–82, American vascular surgeon, scientific journal editor, and medical textbook author.
Reggie September, 90, South African politician and trade unionist, MP (1994–2004).
Reg Simpson, 93, English Test cricketer.
Willis Ware, 93, American computer scientist.

23
Connie Broden, 81, Canadian ice hockey player (Montreal Canadiens).
Al Forman, 85, American baseball umpire.
Walter Frosch, 62, German footballer.
Helena Gąsienica Daniel, 79, Polish Olympic cross-country skier.
Nikolai Kondratenko, 73, Russian politician, Governor of Krasnodar Krai (1997–2001).
Jay Leggett, 50, American actor, writer and comedian (Employee of the Month, Without a Paddle, In Living Color), heart attack.
Peter B. Lewis, 80, American businessman (Progressive Corporation) and philanthropist.
William Jerome McCormack, 89, American Roman Catholic prelate, Auxiliary Bishop of New York (1986–2001).
Wayne Mills, 44, American country music singer, shot.
Raphael Nomiye, 50, Nigerian politician and legislator.
Costanzo Preve, 70, Italian Marxist philosopher.
Solveig Muren Sanden, 95, Norwegian illustrator.
Delbert Tibbs, 74, American anti-death penalty activist.

24
Amedeo Amadei, 92, Italian international footballer.
József Becsei, 63, Hungarian footballer.
Charlie Bicknell, 85, American baseball player (Philadelphia Phillies).
Nancy Borwick, 78, Australian Olympic athlete.
Matthew Bucksbaum, 87, American businessman (General Growth Properties).
Jim Cason, 86, American football player (San Francisco 49ers, Los Angeles Rams).
Lorenzo Coleman, 38, American basketball player (Harlem Globetrotters), aortic aneurysm.
Arnaud Coyot, 33, French cyclist, traffic collision.
Patrick DeFilippo, 74, Italian–born Canadian mobster, cancer.
Danièle Dupré, 75, French singer.
Qusai Emad Al-Khawaldeh, 19, Jordanian footballer, asphyxiation.
Hermine de Graaf, 62, Dutch novelist.
Lou Hyndman, 78, Canadian politician, Alberta provincial minister.
June Keithley, 66, Filipino television journalist and actress, cancer.
Jean King, 87, American politician, Lieutenant Governor of Hawaii (1978–1982), pancreatic cancer.
Gerrit Krol, 79, Dutch author, essayist and writer.
Lloyd Lange, 76, Australian politician, member of the New South Wales Legislative Council (1974–1986).
Robin Leigh-Pemberton, Baron Kingsdown, 87, British peer and banker, Governor of the Bank of England (1983–1993).
Marian Măuță, 37, Romanian footballer.
Matti Ranin, 87, Finnish actor.
Wenceslao Sarmiento, 91, Peruvian-born American modernist architect.
Jerry Seeman, 77, American football official (National Football League), cancer.
David B. Thompson, 90, American Roman Catholic prelate, Bishop of Charleston (1990−1999).
Charlie Ware, 80, Irish hurler (Waterford).

25
William Adam, 96, American trumpeter and bandleader.
Lou Brissie, 89, American baseball player (Philadelphia Athletics), cardiopulmonary failure.
*Chae Myung-shin, 86, South Korean Army general during the Vietnam War.
Wayne K. Clymer, 96, American bishop.
Oralia Domínguez, 88, Mexican opera singer.
Ricardo Fort, 45, Argentinian entrepreneur, television personality, dancer and artist, heart failure.
Bill Foulkes, 81, English footballer (Manchester United, England).
Paul Gnaier, 87, German Olympic fencer (1960, 1964, 1968).
Robert Guillin, 87, French Olympic basketball player.
Shyamali Gupta, 68, Indian politician, heart attack.
Musue Noha Haddad, 44, Liberian journalist.
Chico Hamilton, 92, American jazz drummer.
Jun-Ichi Igusa, 89, Japanese mathematician.
Ryōko Kinomiya, 82, Japanese voice actress (Galaxy Express 999, Speed Racer, Hell Teacher Nube), MODS.
Greg Kovacs, 44, Canadian professional bodybuilder, heart failure. 
Joel Lane, 50, British author.
Egon Lánský, 79, Czech journalist and politician, Deputy Prime Minister (1998–1999).
Elke Neidhardt, 72, German-born Australian opera director (Ring cycles) and actress (Skippy the Bush Kangaroo).
Ken Peters, 98, American baseball player and actor.
Al Plastino, 91, American comic book artist (Superman), prostate cancer.
John Shaw, 56, English radio broadcaster, leptospirosis.
Zéphyrin Toé, 84, Burkinabé Roman Catholic prelate, Bishop of Nouna (1973−2000) and Dédougou (2000−2005).
Toshiaki Tsushima, 77, Japanese film score composer (The Fall of Ako Castle, Battles Without Honor and Humanity), pneumonia.
Seiji Tsutsumi, 86, Japanese writer and businessman, chairman of Seibu Department Stores, liver failure.

26
Karl-Heinz Altermann, 91, German Hauptmann during World War II.
Toon Becx, 93, Dutch footballer (Willem II). 
William Coperthwaite, 83, American yurt builder, traffic collision.
Arik Einstein, 74,  Israeli singer, songwriter and actor, aortic aneurysm.
Marcello Gatti, 89, Italian cinematographer, winner of five Nastro d'Argento awards. 
John Galbraith Graham, 92, British crossword compiler ("Araucaria" of The Guardian) and Church of England priest.
Slobodan Karalić, 57, Yugoslav footballer.
Jane Kean, 90, American actress (The Honeymooners), complications from a fall.
Saul Leiter, 89, American photographer and painter.
Tony Musante, 77, American actor (As the World Turns, Oz, We Own the Night), complications following surgery.
Temistocle Popa, 92, Romanian composer (Veronica, Ma-ma), instrumentalist and actor. 
Bracha Qafih, 90, Israeli rabbanit, recipient of the Israel Prize (1999).
Cayetano Ré, 75, Paraguayan footballer (Barcelona, Espanyol) and manager.
Raimondo Ricci, 92, Italian politician and partisan.
Himachal Som, Indian diplomat.
Jörg Spengler, 74, German Olympic bronze-medalist sailor (1976).
Stan Stennett, 88, Welsh comic entertainer, actor and jazz musician, complications following stroke.
 William Stevenson, 89, British-born Canadian writer.

27
Attilio Bravi, 77, Italian Olympic long jumper (1960).
Lewis Collins, 67, British actor (The Professionals), cancer.
Herbert F. DeSimone, 84, American politician and lawyer, Attorney General of Rhode Island (1967−1971).
Rashit Khamidulin, 76, Russian Soviet diplomat.
Rudolf Lorenzen, 91, German author.
John Massengale, 73–74, American football player.
Mieno Eiko, 87, Japanese politician, chronic heart failure.
David Peleg, 71, Israeli diplomat, Ambassador to Poland (2004–2009).
Volker Roemheld, 72, German agricultural scientist. 
Nílton Santos, 88, Brazilian footballer (Botafogo), World Cup champion (1958, 1962), lung infection.
Manuel F. Segura, 94, Filipino army officer and author.
Wolf Jobst Siedler, 87, German publisher.
Waldemar Świerzy, 82, Polish artist.
Avraham Verdiger, 92, Israeli politician.

28
R. I. T. Alles, 81, Sri Lankan educationalist.
Larry Banner, 77, American Olympic gymnast.
Eduard Liviu Bartales, 59, Romanian footballer.
Howard Clark (pacifist), 63, English pacifist.
Elwood, 8, American Chinese crested/chihuahua dog, World's Ugliest Dog (2007).
Mike Jenkins, 31, American professional strongman, enlarged heart.
Jack Matthews, 88, American book collector and author of philosophical fiction.
Mitja Ribičič, 94, Slovenian politician, Prime Minister of Yugoslavia (1969–1971).
Ronald Clair Roat, 67, American author and journalist.
Jean-Louis Roux, 90, Canadian actor and politician, Lieutenant Governor of Quebec (1996).
Beyle Schaechter-Gottesman, 93, Austrian-born American Yiddish language poet and folk singer.
Mohamed Sibari, 68, Moroccan author.
Max Georg von Twickel, 87, German Roman Catholic prelate, Auxiliary Bishop of Münster (1973−2001).
Danny Wells, 72, Canadian-born American actor (The Jeffersons, Magnolia, Private Benjamin), cancer.

29
Salomon Bengondo, 26, Cameroonian footballer.
Robert L. Bergman, 65, American politician and businessman, esophageal cancer.
Gordie Bonin, 65, Canadian race car driver, member of the Canadian Motorsport Hall of Fame (2000).
Ian Butterworth, 82, British particle physicist.
Clara Cannucciari, 98, American chef and author.
Oliver Cheatham, 65, American singer ("Get Down Saturday Night"), heart attack.
Charles Cooper, 87, American actor (Star Trek, Perry Mason).
Leo Cooper, 79, British writer.
Dick Dodd, 68, American musician (The Bel-Airs, Eddie and the Showmen, The Standells), and Mouseketeer, cancer.
Colin Eglin, 88, South African politician.
Natalya Gorbanevskaya, 77, Russian poet, translator and civil rights activist.
Chris Howland, 85, British-born German radio and television presenter.
Douglas Jones, 91, British mathematician.
Michael Kammen, 77, American historian.
Peter W. Kaplan, 59, American newspaper editor (The New York Observer), cancer.
Bram van der Lek, 82, Dutch politician, MP (1967–1971, 1972–1978), Senator (1983–1984), member of the European Parliament (1984–1989).
Baku Mahadeva, 91, Sri Lankan civil servant. 
Vincent A. Marchiselli, 85, American politician, member of the New York State Assembly, heart attack.
Alfred Monnin, 93, Canadian judge.
Valdis Muižnieks, 78, Latvian Soviet Olympic silver medalist basketball player (1956, 1960, 1964), European champion (1957, 1959, 1961).
Brian Torrey Scott, 37, American writer, colon cancer.

30
Waldyr Calheiros Novaes, 90, Brazilian Roman Catholic prelate, Bishop of Barra do Piraí-Volta Redonda (1966−1999).
Clifford Chadderton, 94, Canadian charity executive (The War Amps).
Paul Crouch, 79, American broadcaster, founder of Trinity Broadcasting Network, heart failure.
Vera Houghton, 99, British health campaigner.
Masino Intaray, 70,  Filipino poet, bard artist, and musician.
Bob Jake, 90,  American basketball player and doctor.
Jean Kent, 92, English actress (The Browning Version), complications from a fall.
Moussa Konaté, 62, Malian author and playwright. 
Baldassare Porto, 90, Italian Olympic sprinter (1952).
Raghuram, 64, Indian film choreographer, heart attack.
Tabu Ley Rochereau, 76, Congolese rumba singer, complications from a stroke.
Doriano Romboni, 44, Italian motorcycle racer, race collision.
Georgina Somerset, 90, British dentist and Royal Navy officer.
Paul Walker, 40, American actor (The Fast and the Furious, Pleasantville, Flags of Our Fathers), traffic collision.
Yury Yakovlev, 85, Russian actor (The Irony of Fate, Anna Karenina, Ivan Vasilievich: Back to the Future).

References

2013-11
 11